Noson Lawen a Welsh language-phrase for a party with music.

Noson Lawen may also refer to:

Noson Lawen (film), 1949
Noson Lawen (TV series), from 1982
Noson Lawen Partners, owner of Rasmussen Reports LLC